The Morgenberghorn is a mountain of the Bernese Alps, overlooking Lake Thun in the Bernese Oberland. It lies at the northern end of the chain between the valleys of Frutigen and Lauterbrunnen, north of the Schwalmere.

References

External links

 Morgenberghorn on Hikr

Mountains of the Alps
Mountains of Switzerland
Mountains of the canton of Bern
Two-thousanders of Switzerland